Obscene Humanity is the debut release by American band Nails. The album was originally released as a seven song, one sided vinyl, with the track list repeating on the reverse side. The band would later rerecord three songs from this EP with Kurt Ballou to serve as a precursor to their 2013 full length Abandon All Life.

Track listing 
 "Disorder" - 1:09
 "Alienate You II" - 0:42
 "Obscene Humanity" - 1:42
 "White Walls" - 1:09
 "Confront Them" - 1:21
 "Lies" - 3:37
 "Alienate You I" - 1:13

Obscene Humanity 7"

Track list
 "Obscene Humanity" – 1:43
 "Confront Them" – 1:20
 "Lies" – 3:34

References 

2009 EPs
Albums produced by Kurt Ballou
Nails (band) albums
Southern Lord Records albums
2012 EPs